Bartolomeus "Bart" Verschoor (born 17 May 1965, in Loenersloot) is a sailor from the Netherlands, who represented his country at the 1988 Summer Olympics in Pusan. Verschoor took the 4th place in the Division II.

Professional life
Verschoor is a selfmade man who, after his Olympic career, started building home and boat related products from sustainable materials.

Further reading

References

External links
 
 
 

1965 births
Living people
Dutch windsurfers
Dutch male sailors (sport)
Olympic sailors of the Netherlands
Sailors at the 1988 Summer Olympics – Division II
Sportspeople from Utrecht (province)
People from Loenen